Iain Wood is a New Zealand rugby footballer who played rugby union for North Harbour and rugby league for the Gold Coast Seagulls.

Playing career
Wood was an experienced centre who played for North Harbour until mid-way through the 1991 season. He then joined the Gold Coast Seagulls and played five games for them over two seasons.

References

Living people
New Zealand rugby league players
New Zealand rugby union players
Rugby union centres
North Harbour rugby union players
Gold Coast Chargers players
Rugby league centres
Rugby league fullbacks
Year of birth missing (living people)